William Cary Edwards (July 20, 1944 – October 20, 2010) was a New Jersey politician who served as the Attorney General of New Jersey from 1986 to 1989.

Early life
He was born on July 20, 1944, in Paterson, New Jersey or Ridgewood, New Jersey. Edwards grew up in Fair Lawn, New Jersey and was raised Catholic by his mother, Virginia, who had converted to Roman Catholicism. His parents separated when he was 11. He and his siblings (a brother, James and a sister, Cheryl) moved with their mother to East Paterson (now Elmwood Park, New Jersey). He graduated from St. Luke's High School in Ho-Ho-Kus, later studying business administration at Seton Hall University, where he graduated in 1967. He received his law degree from Seton Hall University School of Law in 1970 and was admitted to the New Jersey bar the same year.

Career 
Edwards married Lynn Cozzolino in 1970. In 1974 they moved to Oakland, and a year later Edwards was elected councilman there. In 1977 he was elected to the New Jersey General Assembly. He would serve three terms in the Assembly and be named assistant minority leader. Thomas Kean served as Edwards' mentor in the Assembly, and when Kean became Governor of New Jersey in 1982, he selected Edwards as his chief counsel.

Kean then named Edwards Attorney General, and he was sworn in on January 21, 1986, the day of Kean's second inauguration. As Attorney General, Edwards sought to increase the size of the Department of Law and Public Safety; initiated a new anti-drug program; instituted a task force to combat organized crime; planned a virtual overhaul of the Division of Motor Vehicles; and confronted problems such as insurance fraud and state land use planning.

The New Jersey Attorney General's office and the Bureau of Alcohol, Tobacco and Firearms created a Task Force, named "Operation Iceman", to apprehend murderer Richard Kuklinski. It led to the arrest of Kuklinski who was charged with five murder counts and six weapons violations, as well as attempted murder, robbery, and attempted robbery. Edwards spoke to the media in a press conference about the case describing them as murders for profit. ″He set individuals up for business deals, they would disappear and the money would end up in his hands.″.

Edwards ran for Governor of New Jersey in 1989, losing to Jim Courter in the Republican primary. He ran again in 1993, losing out to Christine Todd Whitman, who went on to victory in the general election. In 1995, Edwards opened his own private practice law firm, Edwards & Caldwell, where he worked until 2008.

In 1997 Whitman named Edwards to the New Jersey State Commission of Investigation, and in 2004 Governor Richard Codey appointed him chairman of the commission.

Death
Edwards died at his home in Oakland, New Jersey from cancer on October 20, 2010, aged 66. He was survived by his wife and their two daughters.

References

External links
 

|-

1944 births
2010 deaths
People from Elmwood Park, New Jersey
People from Fair Lawn, New Jersey
People from Oakland, New Jersey
People from Paterson, New Jersey
People from Ridgewood, New Jersey
Deaths from cancer in New Jersey
Politicians from Bergen County, New Jersey
Seton Hall University School of Law alumni
New Jersey city council members
Republican Party members of the New Jersey General Assembly
New Jersey Attorneys General